The C-101 is a Chinese supersonic anti-ship cruise missile. It is manufactured by the China Aerospace Science and Industry Corporation Third Academy.

The C-101 was an early Chinese supersonic cruise missile. It has been described as unsuccessful.

The People's Liberation Army Navy designation is YJ-1.

Description
The C-101 is launched with solid-fuel rocket boosters to a speed of Mach 1.8. Two ramjets sustain a cruise and impact speed of Mach 2. At three kilometers from the target, the missile descends from a cruise altitude of 50 meters to 5 meters.

References

Bibliography

 
Anti-ship cruise missiles of the People's Republic of China
Guided missiles of the People's Republic of China
Weapons of the People's Republic of China
Air-to-surface missiles